Joseph Haydn's Symphony No. 28 in A major, Hoboken I/28, was written in 1765.

The work is scored for 2 oboes, bassoon, 2 horns, and strings with continuo.

The work is in four movements:

Allegro di molto, 
Poco adagio in D major, 
Menuetto e Trio (Trio in A minor), 
Presto, 

The first movement features a four-note motif with an answering 3-note one.  The slow movement features muted strings and contrasts legato passages with dotted staccato sections that anticipate the slow movements of symphonies 60 and 65 where the juxtaposition of the two styles is more stark.  The minuet features bariolage where the same note is heard repeated on different strings, an effect that would later give "The Frog" String Quartet, Op. 50 No. 6, its nickname.  Mark Ferraguto has discussed Haydn's deliberate use of repetition in the trio section of the minuet.

References

Symphony 028
Compositions in A major
1765 compositions